Donal McCann (7 May 1943 – 17 July 1999) was an Irish stage, film, and television actor best known for his roles in the works of Brian Friel and for his lead role in John Huston's last film, The Dead. In 2020, he was listed as number 45 on The Irish Times list of Ireland's greatest film actors.

Biography

Early life
McCann was born in Terenure in Dublin. His father was John J. McCann, a playwright and politician who served twice as Dublin's Lord Mayor. Although Donal had acted in a production of his father's Give Me a Bed of Roses at Terenure College in 1962, he briefly studied architecture before taking a job as a trainee sub-editor at the Evening Press which allowed him to pursue part-time acting classes at the Abbey School of Actors at the same time. He joined the Abbey Players in the late 1960s.

Career
Among his most important early roles were Cuchulainn in W. B. Yeats's On Baile Strand (1966), and as Estragon in a seminal production of Samuel Beckett's Waiting for Godot, partnering with Peter O'Toole as Vladimir (1969).

His career included parts in many plays from the Irish literary canon, including Tarry Flynn, The Shaughran, and the Gate Theatre's highly acclaimed production of Seán O'Casey's classic Juno and the Paycock in the 1980s (McCann played the "Paycock" (Captain Boyle) opposite Geraldine Plunkett as Juno and John Kavanagh as Joxer Daly) as well as a subsequent production of O'Casey's The Plough and the Stars.

McCann developed a particularly fruitful relationship with the playwright Brian Friel. He played the role of Gar O'Donnell, the public figure, in a film adaptation of Philadelphia, Here I Come! in 1970 and, despite popular belief, he never played either public or private Gar on stage. He gave a landmark performance as Frank Hardy, the title character, in Faith Healer in 1980 (a role he reprised in 1994), continuing his relationship with Friel through productions of Translations (1988) and Wonderful Tennessee (1993).

Friel has said that McCann's work "contains extraordinary characteristics that go beyond acting ... it is deeply spiritual". Perhaps McCann's most renowned role was as Thomas Dunne in Sebastian Barry's The Steward of Christendom. He won the London Critics Circle Theatre Award (Drama Theatre) as best actor for this role in 1995. He reprised this role in a 1996 production at The Gate Theatre, Dublin and, following a twelve-week run at the Brooklyn Academy of Music in 1997, his "performance of unarguable greatness" (The New York Observer) had Newsweek hailing him as "a world-class star", and The New York Times referring to this "astonishing Irish actor...widely regarded as the finest of them all".

On the London stage, McCann played in Prayer for My Daughter opposite Antony Sher (1978), and was Jean to Dame Helen Mirren's Julie in Miss Julie (1971). This was filmed for the BBC, and McCann would much later play Judge Brack with Fiona Shaw in the title role of Ibsen's Hedda Gabler, a production filmed for the BBC in 1993.

McCann began his film career early, in 1966, in Disney's The Fighting Prince of Donegal (this later became a TV series). More significant roles included the title character's father Shamie in Cal and one of the feuding brothers in Thaddeus O'Sullivan's December Bride (1990–1994). He worked a number of times with Neil Jordan (in Angel, The Miracle and High Spirits).

His best-known film role was as Gabriel Conroy in The Dead (1987), starring opposite Anjelica Huston and directed by her father, John Huston. Significant late roles included Bernardo Bertolucci's Stealing Beauty (1996) and in John Turturro's Illuminata (released in 1999, after McCann's death).

McCann's television work included the featured role of Phineas Finn in the BBC's serialised adaptation of Anthony Trollope's The Pallisers, Willie Burke in RTÉ's Prix Italia drama entry The Burke Enigma (1979) and Barney Mulhall in RTÉ's Strumpet City (1980), as well as many one-off parts.

McCann played in Bob Quinn's Irish-language film Poitín (1979) and in Quinn's somewhat experimental The Bishop's Story (1995). After hearing that McCann was ill, Tom Collins asked Bob Quinn to make a TV documentary about McCann for RTÉ (in 1998) called It Must Be Done Right (after a remark by McCann on his craft). The film aired on RTÉ a week before McCann's death.

Personal life
In his private life, McCann was a quiet and unassuming man, but he battled both depression and alcoholism all his life. He had many friends in Irish theatre and artistic circles but also across all strata of life. His hobbies included sketching and he was passionate about horse racing.

He died at the age of 56 from pancreatic cancer.

Filmography

Books
 Faith O'Grady, Pat Laffan, eds.  2000.  Donal McCann Remembered. (New Island Books)
 The Fleadh Papers.  1998.  Donal McCann: In Conversation with Gerry Stembridge at the Galway Film Fleadh, Sunday 12 July 1998.  (Film West)

References

External links

1943 births
1999 deaths
Irish male film actors
Irish male stage actors
Irish male television actors
Deaths from pancreatic cancer
People from County Dublin
Deaths from cancer in the Republic of Ireland
20th-century Irish male actors